The following is an alphabetical list of Greek and Latin roots, stems, and prefixes commonly used in the English language from H to O. See also the lists from A to G and from P to Z.

Some of those used in medicine and medical technology are not listed here but instead in the entry for List of medical roots, suffixes and prefixes.

Collation

Note that root groups such as "ad-, a-, ac-, af-, ag-, al-, am-, an-, ap-, ar-, as-, at-" are collated under the head item (first item listed), which is sometimes followed by alternative roots that might have collated earlier in the table had they been listed separately (in this example, "a-" and "ac-").

Roots H–O

References

Lists of words